John Edward Young (14 August 1908 – 1 December 1979) was an Australian rules footballer who played with Carlton and Melbourne in the Victorian Football League (VFL).

References

Holmesby, Russell & Main, Jim (2007). The Encyclopedia of AFL Footballers. 7th ed. Melbourne: Bas Publishing.

External links

Australian rules footballers from Victoria (Australia)
Carlton Football Club players
Melbourne Football Club players
Yarrawonga Football Club players
1908 births
1979 deaths